| tries = {{#expr:

 + 6 + 5 + 14 + 5 + 5 + 4 + 7  + 2 + 4  + 6
 + 7 + 4 + 4  + 9 + 3 + 7 + 6  + 4 + 11 + 1
 + 4 + 4 + 5  + 6 + 6 + 6 + 6  + 5 + 9  + 2
 + 4 + 1 + 10 + 4 + 1 + 3 + 10 + 5 + 2  + 8
 + 1 + 5 + 13 + 4 + 4 + 6 + 8  + 6 + 0  + 8
 + 6 + 4 + 4  + 9 + 4 +11 + 6  + 6 + 11 + 5
 + 6 + 5 + 6 + 2
 + 3 + 0
 + 5
}}
| top point scorer = Owen Farrell (Saracens)(126 points)
| top try scorer = Isa Nacewa (Leinster)(7 tries)
| venue = Murrayfield, Edinburgh
| attendance2 =
| champions = Saracens (2nd title)
| count =
| runner-up = Clermont
| website = http://www.epcrugby.com
| previous year = 2015–16
| previous tournament = 2015–16 European Rugby Champions Cup
| next year = 2017–18
| next tournament = 2017–18 European Rugby Champions Cup
}}

The 2016–17 European Rugby Champions Cup was the third European Rugby Champions Cup championship (22nd overall), the annual rugby union club competition for teams from the top six nations in European rugby. The competition replaced the Heineken Cup, which was Europe's top-tier competition for rugby clubs for the first nineteen years of professional European rugby union. The opening round of the tournament took place on the weekend of 14/15/16 October 2016. The final took place on 13 May 2017 at Murrayfield in Edinburgh.

English side Saracens were the 2015–16 champions, having beaten Racing 92 of France in the 2016 final in Lyon.

Saracens retained the cup, defeating Clermont in the final 28–17.

Teams
Twenty clubs from the three major European domestic and regional leagues competed in the Champions Cup. Nineteen of these qualified directly as a result of their league performance.

The distribution of teams was:
 England: 6 clubs
 The top 6 clubs in the English Premiership. (6 clubs)
 France: 7 clubs
 The top 6 clubs in the Top 14. (6 clubs)
 There was a seventh club from France, after Montpellier won the 2015–16 European Rugby Challenge Cup. (1 club)
 Ireland, Italy, Scotland & Wales: 7 clubs, based on performance in the Pro12.
 The best placed club from each nation. (4 clubs)
 The 3 highest ranked clubs not qualified thereafter. (3 clubs)

Due to the 2015 Rugby World Cup, it was decided that the play-off system that had previously decided the final team would be suspended, and that this year the winner of the 2015–16 European Rugby Challenge Cup would automatically qualify for the tournament. In the event this team had already qualified, the team's domestic league would be allocated an extra qualifying place.

The following teams qualified for the 2016–17 tournament.

This was the first time all four Irish provinces qualified for Europe's top club competition on their own merits, as Connacht's two previous appearances in the former Heineken Cup had been as a result of Leinster winning that cup the previous season.

Team details
Below is the list of coaches, captain and stadiums with their method of qualification for each team.

Note: Placing shown in brackets, denotes standing at the end of the regular season for their respective leagues, with their end of season positioning shown through CH for Champions, RU for Runner-up, SF for losing Semi-finalist and QF for losing Quarter-finalist.

Seeding
The 20 competing teams are seeded and split into four tiers, each containing 5 teams.

For the purpose of creating the tiers, clubs are ranked based on their domestic league performances and on their qualification for the knockout phases of their championships, so a losing quarter-finalist in the Top 14 would be seeded below a losing semi-finalist, even if they finished above them in the regular season.

Based on these seedings, teams are placed into one of the four tiers, with the top seed clubs being put in Tier 1. The nature of the tier system means that a draw is needed to allocate two of the three second seed clubs to Tier 1. Exeter Chiefs and Leinster were drawn into Tier 1, meaning the remaining side - Toulon went into Tier 2. As a result of this draw, Montpellier also entered Tier 2, as the fourth seed from the league of the second seed placed in Tier 2. The other two fourth-ranked sides fell into Tier 3.

The tiers are shown below. Brackets show each team's seeding and their league (for example, 1 Top 14 indicates the team was seeded 1st from the Top 14).

The following restrictions will apply to the draw:
 Each pool will consist of four clubs, one from each Tier in the draw.
 Each pool must have one from each league drawn from Tier 1,2 or 3. No pool will have a second team from the same league until the allocation of Tier 4 takes place.
 Where two PRO12 clubs compete in the same pool, they must be from different countries.

Pool stage

The draw took place on 29 June 2016, in Neuchâtel, Switzerland.

Teams will play each other twice, both at home and away, in the group stage, that will begin on weekend of 14/15/16 October 2016, and continue through to 20/21/22 January 2017, before the pool winners and three best runners-up progressed to the quarter finals.

Teams will be awarded competition points, based on match result. Teams receive 4 points for a win, 2 points for a draw, 1 attacking bonus point for scoring four or more tries in a match and 1 defensive bonus point for losing a match by seven points or fewer.

In the event of a tie between two or more teams, the following tie-breakers will be used, as directed by EPCR:
 Where teams have played each other
 The club with the greater number of competition points from only matches involving tied teams.
 If equal, the club with the best aggregate points difference from those matches.
 If equal, the club that scored the most tries in those matches.
 Where teams remain tied and/or have not played each other in the competition (i.e. are from different pools)
 The club with the best aggregate points difference from the pool stage.
 If equal, the club that scored the most tries in the pool stage.
 If equal, the club with the fewest players suspended in the pool stage.
 If equal, the drawing of lots will determine a club's ranking.

Pool 1

Pool 2

Pool 3

Pool 4

Pool 5

Ranking of pool leaders and runners-up

Knock-out stage

Format
The eight qualifiers are ranked according to their performance in the pool stage and compete in the quarter-finals which will be held on the weekend of 31 March, 1/2 April 2017. The four top teams will host the quarter-finals against the four lower teams in a 1v8, 2v7, 3v6 and 4v5 format.

The semi-finals will played on the weekend of 22/23 April 2017. In lieu of the draw that used to determine the semi-final pairing, EPCR announced that a fixed semi-final bracket would be set in advance, and that the home team would be designated based on "performances by clubs during the pool stages as well as the achievement of a winning a quarter-final match away from home". Semi-final matches must be played at a neutral ground in the designated home team's country.

Home country advantage will be awarded as follows:

The winners of the semi-finals will contest the final, at Murrayfield, on 13 May 2017.

Bracket

Quarter-finals

Semi-finals

Final

Attendances

Does not include final as they are played at a neutral venue.

See also
 2016–17 European Rugby Challenge Cup

Notes

References

 
Champions Cup
European Rugby Champions Cup
European Rugby Champions Cup
European Rugby Champions Cup
European Rugby Champions Cup
European Rugby Champions Cup
European Rugby Champions Cup
European Rugby Champions Cup
European Rugby Champions Cup seasons